Switch is a 1994 remix EP by Schaft.  Switch is a companion release to Switchblade, which is where the original versions of the remixes come from.

Track listing

References

1994 debut EPs
Schaft albums
1994 remix albums
Remix EPs
Victor Entertainment remix albums
Victor Entertainment EPs